"The World Is Mine" is a song written, produced and performed by American recording artist Ice Cube. It was released as the first single from the soundtrack to the 1997 action thriller film Dangerous Ground. It was recorded at Ice Cube's home recording studio Westside Studios in California, and released on January 13, 1997, via Jive Records. Fellow rappers Mack 10 and K-Dee made cameo appearance on the track and in its music video. The single peaked at number 55 on the Hot R&B/Hip-Hop Songs and number 39 on the Hot Rap Songs. The song was later re-released on Ice Cube's compilation In the Movies.

Track listing

Personnel
 O'Shea "Ice Cube" Jackson – lead vocals, lyrics, producer
 Dedrick "Mack 10" Rolison – backing vocals
 Darrell "K-Dee" Johnson – backing vocals
 Brian "Big Bass" Gardner – mastering

Charts

References

External links
 

1997 songs
1997 singles
Ice Cube songs
Jive Records singles
Songs written by Ice Cube
Gangsta rap songs